Danny Minnick is an American Neo Expressionist painter and professional skateboarder.

Early life
Minnick was born in Seattle, Washington, United States.

He started sketching out his favorite cartoon characters when he was only in 3rd grade. At the same time, he started skateboarding.

Professional skateboarding
Minnick became a professional skateboarder in his early teenage years. His career in skateboarding lasted for two decades. In 2010 he suffered from an Achilles tendon injury and pulled every ligament in his left ankle while working as an on camera stunt double for three time Olympic gold medalist Shaun White.

His first sponsors were Fallout Records and Skateboards, Venture trucks, Vans, Spitfire Wheels and H-Street.

Painting career
In 2011, Chad Muska, one of Minnick’s closest friends; an artist and a fellow professional skateboarder taught Minnick how to stretch and build his own canvases and renewed his desire to paint.

He started experimenting with painting and his interest quickly transformed into a career when he received an opportunity for his first gallery exhibition; titled “17 pieces”.

He had his first solo show at a Los Angeles gallery in 2011, and it became his breakthrough.

Minnick is known for his neo expressionist and vibrant painting style. Interview Magazine noted that distinctive features which include De Kooning’ bold brushstrokes, Pollock’s signature drips, Keith Haring’s cartoon imagery and Basquiat’s daring use of color all had an impact on the development of Minnick’s style.

His work(s) was featured on the walls of places like Miami's Wynwood and the Barbican Underground Station in London.

He has exhibited internationally and is a lifetime member of the Actors Studio.

References

Living people
Neo-expressionist artists
Artist skateboarders
American skateboarders
Skate photographers
Year of birth missing (living people)